This is a list of frigates of the Netherlands navy.

Pieter Florisz sold before commissioning to Greece see 
Witte de With sold before commissioning to Greece see 

 / 

Karel Doorman

Willem van der Zaan

See also

 Sail
Netherlands